In enzymology, a phospholipid-hydroperoxide glutathione peroxidase is an enzyme that catalyzes the chemical reaction

2 glutathione + a lipid hydroperoxide  glutathione disulfide + lipid + 2 H2O

Thus, the two substrates of this enzyme are glutathione and lipid hydroperoxide, whereas its 3 products are glutathione disulfide, lipid, and H2O.

This enzyme belongs to the family of oxidoreductases, to be specific those acting on a peroxide as acceptor (peroxidases).  The systematic name of this enzyme class is glutathione:lipid-hydroperoxide oxidoreductase. Other names in common use include peroxidation-inhibiting protein, PHGPX, peroxidation-inhibiting protein: peroxidase, glutathione, (phospholipid hydroperoxide-reducing), phospholipid hydroperoxide glutathione peroxidase, hydroperoxide glutathione peroxidase, or glutathione peroxidase 4 (GPX4).  This enzyme participates in glutathione metabolism.

Structural studies

References

 

EC 1.11.1
Enzymes of known structure